The 2003–04 Pro Tour season was the ninth season of the Magic: The Gathering Pro Tour. On 23 August 2003 the season began with parallel Grand Prixs in Yokohama and London. It ended on 5 September 2004 with the conclusion of the 2004 World Championship in San Francisco. Beginning with this season Wizards of the Coast moved the Pro Tour schedule farther backwards in the year to synchronize it with the calendar year. The season consisted of 26 Grand Prixs and 7 Pro Tours, held in Boston, New Orleans, Amsterdam, Kobe, San Diego, Seattle, and San Francisco. Also the Master Series tournaments were discontinued and replaced by payout at the end of the year based on the Pro Player of the year standings. At the end of the season Gabriel Nassif was proclaimed Pro Player of the year, the first player after Kai Budde's three-year-domination period, and also the first player to win the title without winning a Pro Tour in the same season.

Grand Prixs – Yokohama, London, Atlanta 

GP Yokohama (23–24 August)
Format: Block Constructed
 Shu Komuro
 Kazuki Kato
 Masashiro Kuroda
 Yuichi Yamagishi
 Masahiko Morita
 Shuhei Nakamura
 Kazuyuki Momose
 Yusuke Osaka

GP London (23–24 August)
Format: Block Constructed
 Diego Ostrovich
 Yann Hamon
 Mario Pascoli
 Eivind Nitter
 Antonino De Rosa
 Jose Barbero
 Josh Rider
 Frank Karsten

GP Atlanta (30–31 August)
Format: Standard
 Marco Blume
 Matt Linde
 Joshua Wagener
 Keith McLaughlin
 Zvi Mowshowitz
 Keith Thompson
 Sean Buckley
 Tim Bonneville

Pro Tour – Boston (12–14 September 2003) 

"Phoenix Foundation" had its third consecutive Pro Tour Top 4 appearance, but this time they were eliminated by eventual champions "The Brockafellars". The team consisting of William Jensen, Matt Linde, and Brock Parker had allegedly not done a single practice draft in the format.

Tournament data 
Prize pool: $200,100
Players: 399 (133 teams)
Format: Team Sealed (Onslaught, Legions, Scourge) – first day, Team Rochester Draft (Onslaught-Legions-Scourge) – final two days
Head Judge: Collin Jackson

Top 4

Final standings

Pro Player of the year standings

Grand Prixs – Genova, Sydney, Kansas City, Lyon 

GP Genova (13–14 September)
Format: Block Constructed
 Reinhard Blech
 Jan Doise
 Stefano Fiore
 André Müller
 Simone Carboni
 Alessandro Vegna
 Marco Benifei
 Martin Heidemann

GP Sydney (4–5 October)
Format: Rochester Draft
 Andrew Grain
 Andrew Gordon
 Lenny Collins
 Itaru Ishida
 Shun Jiang
 Jake Hart
 Daniel Turner
 Tim He

GP Kansas City (18–19 October)
Format: Rochester Draft
 Antonino De Rosa
 Nathan Heiss
 Ben Stark
 Brian Kibler
 Michael Krumb
 Gerry Thompson
 Justin Smith
 Jonathan Cassidy

GP Lyon (25–26 October)
Format: Rochester Draft
 Yann Hamon
 Bruno Carvalho
 Daniel Madan
 Jeroen Remie
 Kevin Desprez
 Loïc Degrau
 Sebastien Bernaud
 Jelger Wiegersma

Pro Tour – New Orleans (31 October – 2 November 2003) 

After finishing second with his team in Boston, Rickard Österberg returned to win Pro Tour New Orleans. The Extended format of New Orleans is considered to be one of the most powerful of all time and Österberg's deck was built around the soon to be banned card , too.

Tournament data 
Prize pool: $200,130
Players: 318
Format: Extended
Head Judge: Mike Guptil

Top 8 

* Hamon and Labarre both had to catch a flight on the morning of the Top 8 and did not want to book two new flights. They thus played an unofficial match at their hotel on the preceding evening to decide who would officially concede to the other. Hamon won 3–2.

Final standings

Pro Player of the year standings

Grand Prixs – Shizuoka, Gothenburg, Munich, Anaheim 

GP Shizuoka (8–9 November)
Format: Rochester Draft
 Kazuki Katou
 Satoshi Harada
 Koichiro Maki
 Tomohide Sasagawa
 Kei Ikeda
 Ken'Ichi Fujita
 Ryouma Shiozu
 Yusuke Sasaki

GP Gothenburg (22–23 November)
Format: Rochester Draft
 Jelger Wiegersma
 Tommi Hovi
 Daniel Bertelsen
 Kai Budde
 Sam Gomersall
 Daniel Zink
 David Linder
 Benjamin Lindqvist

GP Munich (6–7 December)
Format: Rochester Draft
 Yann Hamon
 Reinhard Blech
 Georgios Kapalas
 Stefan Schwaiger
 Tobias Kroll
 Hannes Scholz
 Steven Gouin
 Dirk Hein

GP Anaheim (13–14 December)
Format: Extended
 Ben Rubin
 Nathan Saunders
 Nick Meves
 Peter Szigeti
 Ben Stark
 Paul Rietzl
 Blake Quelle
 Gerard Fabiano

Pro Tour – Amsterdam (16–18 January 2004) 

Norwegian Nicolai Herzog defeated Osamu Fujita in the finals to win Pro Tour Amsterdam. Other than Fujita and Herzog the final eight included only accomplished players with at least one other lifetime Pro Tour final day appearance.

Tournament data 

Players: 347
Prize Pool: $200,130
Format: Rochester Draft (Mirrodin)
Head Judge: Gijsbert Hoogendijk

Top 8

Final standings

Pro Player of the year standings

Grand Prixs – Okayama, Oakland, Madrid 

GP Okayama (24–25 January)
Format: Extended
 Kazuya Shiki
 Itaru Ishida
 Akira Asahara
 SangRyeol Lee
 Shinsuke Hayashi
 Asuka Doi
 Chikara Nakajima
 Kazura Hirabayashi

GP Oakland (7–8 February)
Format: Sealed and Booster Draft
 Ken Ho
 Dave Humpherys
 Mike Turian
 Ian Spaulding
 Mitchell Tamblyn
 Ben Rubin
 Paul Rietzl
 Gabe Walls

GP Madrid (21–22 February)
Format: Sealed and Booster Draft
 Kai Budde
 Bernardo Da Costa Cabral
 Dirk Hein
 Raphaël Lévy
 Thomas Gundersen
 Aniol Alcaraz
 Jaime Marrero
 Tommi Lindgren

Pro Tour – Kobe (27–29 February 2004) 

On home turf Masashiro Kuroda won the first Pro Tour title for Japan, defeating Gabriel Nassif in the finals.

Tournament data 

Players: 239
Prize Pool: $200,130
Format: Mirrodin Block Constructed (Mirrodin, Darksteel)
Head Judge: Collin Jackson

Top 8

Final standings

Pro Player of the year standings

Grand Prixs – Hong Kong, Sendai, Columbus, Birmingham, Washington DC, Bochum 

GP Hong Kong (6–7 March)
Format: Sealed and Booster Draft
 Chuen Hwa Tan
 Olivier Ruel
 Masashi Oiso
 Gabe Walls
 Takuya Osawa
 Steven Tan
 Terry Soh
 Chi-Chung Hwang

GP Sendai (20–21 March)
Format: Sealed and Booster Draft
 Ichiro Shimura
 Masahiko Morita
 Yusuke Sasaki
 Antoine Ruel
 Jin Okamoto
 Toshihisa Yamanaka
 Hiroto Yasutomi
 Ippei Sogabe

GP Columbus (27–28 March)
Format: Sealed and Booster Draft
 Mike Turian
 Craig Krempels
 Aaron Lipcynski
 Cedric Phillips
 Kate Stavola
 Matt Larson
 Brandon Rickard
 Brock Parker

GP Birmingham (27–28 March)
Format: Sealed and Booster Draft
 Stefan Jedlicka
 René Kraft
 Frank Karsten
 David Grant
 Mattias Jorstedt
 Jose Barbero
 Kamman Janpiam
 Niki Jedlicka

GP Washington D.C. (17–18 April)
Format: Team Limited
1. Thaaaat's me
 Chris Fennell
 Bill Stead
 Charles Gindy
2. Shenanigans
 Adam Horvath
 Osyp Lebedowicz
 Patrick Sullivan
3. Your Move Games/Illuminati
 Darwin Kastle
 Rob Dougherty
 Alex Shvartsman
4. Re-Elect Gore
 Jon Finkel
 Brian Kibler
 Eric Froehlich

GP Bochum (17–18 April)
Format: Team Limited
1. Schietkoe
 Stijn Cornelissen
 Tom van de Logt
 Jesse Cornelissen
2. Team Burkas
 Nicolai Herzog
 Anton Jonsson
 Tuomo Nieminen
3. The Unusual Suspects
 David Brucker
 Reinhard Blech
 Dirk Hein
4. NPC All Stars
 Sylvain Lehoux
 Alexandre Peset
 Loic Degrou

Pro Tour – San Diego (14–16 May 2004) 

The second Mirrodin Draft Pro Tour saw three players amongst the final four, who had already finished in the Top 8 in the first Mirrodin Draft Pro Tour. Nicolai Herzog even followed his Amsterdam win up with another win victory, thus taking home the title in both Mirrodin Draft Pro Tours.

Tournament data 

Players: 312
Prize Pool: $200,130
Format: Mirrodin Booster Draft (Mirrodin-Darksteel)
Head Judge: Collin Jackson

Top 8

Final standings

Pro Player of the year standings

Grand Prixs – Brussels, Zurich 

GP Brussels (29–30 May)
Format: Block Constructed
 Tobias Henke
 Kai Budde
 Julien Nuijten
 Vasilis Fatouros
 Johannes Mitsios
 Xuan-Phi Nguyen
 Maxime Fays
 Stefano Fiore

GP Zurich (26–27 June)
Format: Block Constructed
 Manuel Bucher
 Matteo Cirigliano
 Sebastien Roux
 Frank Karsten
 Leonard Barbou
 Bertrand Fagnoni
 Timo Groth
 Charles Delvaux

Pro Tour – Seattle (9–11 July 2004) 

Team "Von Dutch" from the Netherlands defeated Japanese "www.shop-fireBall.com2" in the finals to become the 2004 Pro Tour Seattle champions. The team consisted of Jeroen Remie, Jelger Wiegersma, and Kamiel Cornelissen.

Tournament data 

Players: 321 (107 teams)
Prize Pool: $200,100
Format: Team Sealed (Mirrodin, Darksteel, Fifth Dawn) – first day, Team Rochester Draft (Mirrodin-Darksteel-Fifth Dawn)
Head Judge: Gijsbert Hoogendijk

Top 4

Final standings

Pro Player of the year standings

Grand Prixs – Kuala Lumpur, Orlando, New Jersey, Nagoya 

GP Kuala Lumpur (24–25 July)
Format: Standard
 Masahiko Morita
 Kwan Ching Yuen
 Zhen Xing Gao
 Tsuyoshi Fujita
 Sim Han How
 Cheng Wee Pek
 Bernard Chan
 Khang Jong Kuan

GP Orlando (24–25 July)
Format: Block Constructed
 Osyp Lebedowicz
 Michael Kuhmann
 Adam Chernoff
 Taylor Parnell
 William Jensen
 Antonino De Rosa
 Jeff Garza
 Harry Durnan

GP New Jersey (14–15 August)
Format: Block Constructed
 Jeff Garza
 Brian Kibler
 Eugene Harvey
 Jeroen Remie
 Jan Holland
 Adam Horvath
 Alexandre Peset
 Ty Dobbertin

GP Nagoya (28–29 August)
Format: Standard
 Tatsunori Kishi
 Keisuke Hashimoto
 Masami Ibamoto
 Shun Iizuka
 Toru Takeshita
 Yuhi Kubota
 Masaki Yokoi
 Tomoharu Saitou

2004 World Championships – San Francisco (1–5 September 2004) 

Fifteen-year-old Julien Nuijten from the Netherlands won the 2004 World Championship, defeating Aeo Paquette in the finals. Gabriel Nassif had his third final eight appearance within the season and thus claimed Pro Player of the year title. It was also his and Kamiel Cornelissen's fifth overall Top 8. Germany won the national team competition, defeating Belgium in the finals.

Tournament data 
Prize pool: $208,130 (individual) + $208,000 (national teams)
Players: 304
Formats: Standard, Booster Draft (Mirrodin-Darksteel-Fifth Dawn), Mirrodin Block Constructed (Mirrodin, Darksteel, Fifth Dawn)
Head Judge: Gijsbert Hoogendijk, Collin Jackson

Top 8

Final standings

National team competition 

  Germany (Sebastian Zink, Torben Twiefel, Roland Bode)
  Belgium (Dilson Ramos Da Fonseca, Vincent Lemoine, Geoffrey Siron)

Pro Player of the year final standings 

After the World Championship Gabriel Nassif was awarded the Pro Player of the year title. He was the first player to win the title without winning a Pro Tour in the same season.

References 

Magic: The Gathering professional events